Curt Ferdinand Bühler (11 July 1905 – 2 August 1985) was an American librarian and expert of early books who published mainly on the art and history of books printed during the fifteenth century.  He took degrees from Yale University (B.A., 1927) and Trinity College, Dublin (Ph.D., 1930).  After post-doctoral studies in the University of Munich (1931-1933), he worked as a rare book curator at the Pierpont Morgan Library from 1934, was appointed Keeper of Printed Books in 1948, and remained with the Morgan Library until his formal retirement in 1973. His own collection of manuscripts and early printed books was bequeathed to the same library.

Bühler served as president of both the Bibliographical Society of America (1952-1954) and the Renaissance Society of America (1961-1963), and was a member of many other organizations including the Grolier Club, the Century Association, the Modern Language Association, the American Council of Learned Societies, the American Academy of Arts and Sciences, and the American Philosophical Society.

Personal life
In July 1971, Bühler married Lucy Jane Ford Schoettle.

Bibliography 
1947: The Bible, Manuscripts and Printed Bibles from the Fourth to the Nineteenth Century, Pierpont Morgan Library, New York
1949: Standards of Bibliographical Description, University of Pennsylvania Press, Philadelphia
1960: The Fifteenth-Century Book: the scribes, the printers, the decorators, University of Pennsylvania Press, Philadelphia 
1960: William Caxton and His Critics: A Critical Reappraisal of Caxton's Contributions to the Enrichment of the English Language, Syracuse University Press, Syracuse, N.Y.  
1973: Early Books and Manuscripts: forty years of research, The Grolier Club, New York

References

1905 births
1985 deaths
American librarians
Fellows of the British Academy
Fellows of the Medieval Academy of America
Yale University alumni
American expatriates in Ireland
American expatriates in Germany

Members of the American Philosophical Society